"Halfway Down" is a song written by Jim Lauderdale, and recorded by American country music artist Patty Loveless.  It was released in July 1995 as the fourth single from her album When Fallen Angels Fly.  Dave Edmunds' recording was released in July 1994 on his Plugged In album.

The song charted for 20 weeks on the Billboard Hot Country Singles and Tracks chart, reaching number 6 during the week of October 7, 1995.

Charts

Weekly charts

Year-end charts

References

1995 singles
1994 songs
Dave Edmunds songs
Patty Loveless songs
Songs written by Jim Lauderdale
Song recordings produced by Emory Gordy Jr.
Epic Records singles